Howard M. Weinstein (born 1953) is an American bridge player from Chicago, Illinois. He is a graduate of University of Minnesota. He is related to Josh (J. Elvis) Weinstein from Mystery Science Theater 3000.

Bridge accomplishments

Wins

 North American Bridge Championships (10)
 von Zedtwitz Life Master Pairs (1) 1997 
 Silodor Open Pairs (1) 1996 
 Blue Ribbon Pairs (1) 1998 
 Nail Life Master Open Pairs (1) 2006 
 Grand National Teams (1) 1991 
 Vanderbilt (1) 1993 
 Mitchell Board-a-Match Teams (2) 2012, 2019
 Reisinger (2) 1997, 2001

Runners-up

 Bermuda Bowl (1) 2007
 North American Bridge Championships
 von Zedtwitz Life Master Pairs (3) 1988, 1989, 2007 
 Grand National Teams (2) 1986, 1988 
 Jacoby Open Swiss Teams (1) 2002 
 Mitchell Board-a-Match Teams (2) 1987, 2002 
 Reisinger (4) 1987, 1995, 2008, 2010 
 Spingold (1) 2008

References

External links
 

1953 births
Living people
American contract bridge players
Bermuda Bowl players
Place of birth missing (living people)
Date of birth missing (living people)
People from Chicago
University of Minnesota alumni